The 163rd Infantry Regiment is a regiment of the Montana National Guard.
It went overseas with the 41st Infantry Division in World War II.

History
In December 1942, General Douglas MacArthur decided to commit more American troops to the Battle of Buna-Gona. The 163rd Regimental Combat Team, under the command of Colonel Jens A. Doe, was alerted on 14 December 1942. It arrived at Port Moresby on 27 December. The first elements, which included the 1st Battalion and regimental headquarters, flew over the Owen Stanley Range to Popondetta and Dobodura on 30 December, where they came under the command of Lieutenant General Edmund Herring's Advanced New Guinea Force.

The 163rd Regimental Combat Team was attached to Major General George Alan Vasey's 7th Division and Doe assumed command of the Sanananda Front from Brigadier Ivan Dougherty on 3 January 1943. The front line consisted of a raised road with Japanese positions on relatively dry ground astride it, surrounded by jungle swamp. Roadblocks had been established behind the Japanese positions but they had not been budged; both sides resupplied their positions through the swamp. Vasey's plan was for the Americans to fix the Japanese in position while he attacked with Brigadier George Wootten's 18th Infantry Brigade, supported by M3 Stuart light tanks of the 2/6th Armoured Regiment and 25 pounders of the 2/1st Field Regiment.

Lineage

Primary verification for this information was provided by 

Constituted in the Montana National Guard as the 1st Regiment of Infantry and organized 1884- 1887 from existing companies.
 Redesignated as the 1st Montana Volunteer Infantry and mustered into federal service 5–10 May 1898 at Helena; served in the Philippines and mustered out 17 October 1899 at San Francisco, Ca.
 Reorganized 30 May 1901- 1 December 1903 as the 2nd infantry Montana National Guard.
 Mustered into federal service at Fort William Henry Harrison 27 June 1916 for Mexican border and stationed at Douglas Ar. ; mustered out 3 November 1916 at Fort William H. Harrison.
 Mustered into federal service 7 April 1917 at Fort William H. Harrison. Consolidated with the 3rd Battalion 3rd Infantry District of Columbia National Guard, Reorganized and redesignated the 163rd Infantry Regiment and assigned to the 41st Infantry Division (United States) 19 September 1917.
 Demobilized 21 February 1919 at Camp Dix, NJ.
 Reconstituted as the 2nd Infantry Montana National Guard and reorganized during 1921–1922.
 Redesignated as the 163rd Infantry Regiment and assigned to the 41st Infantry Division 1 May 1922.
 Federally recognized 20 January 1924 with headquarters at Helena.
 Headquarters relocated to Billings 29 December 1939
 Inducted into federal service 16 September 1940 at Billings
 Inactivated 31 December 1945 in Japan. (p. 50)
 Relieved from the 41st Infantry Division 17 June 1946.
 Reorganized and federally recognized 21 April 1947 with headquarters at Bozeman.
 Relieved from 163rd Regimental Combat Team and redesignated as the 163rd Armored Cavalry 1 March 1953
 Reorganized and redesignated 1 December 1988 as the 163d Cavalry, a parent regiment under the U.S. Army Regimental System, with headquarters at Butte, to consist of the 1st and 2nd Battalions and Troop E, elements of the 163d Armored Cavalry Regiment, and the 163rd Infantry (163rd Infantry - henceforth separate lineage). 
Withdrawn 1 June 1989 from CARS and reorganized under the U.S. Army Regimental System with headquarters at Belgrade.

Distinctive unit insignia
 Description
A Gold color metal and enamel device 1 1/8 inches (2.86 cm) in height overall consisting of a shield blazoned:  Per fess Argent and Azure, in chief a palm tree on a mount Proper and in base a giant cactus and fleur-de-lis Or.  Attached below the shield is a Blue scroll doubled and inscribed "MEN, DO YOUR DUTY" in Gold letters.
 Symbolism
The palm tree represents Philippine service, the giant cactus Mexican Border duty and the fleur-de-lis service in France during World War I.  Blue and white are the colors associated with Infantry and refer to the organization's combat service as the 163d Infantry during World War II.
 Background
The distinctive unit insignia was originally approved for the 163d Infantry Regiment, Montana National Guard on 8 December 1941.  It was redesignated for the 163d Armored Cavalry Regiment, Montana National Guard on 17 September 1953.  It was amended to change the symbolism on 21 January 1970.  The insignia was updated to include both the Montana and Nevada Army National Guard on 20 January 1975.  It was redesignated for the 163d Infantry Regiment, Montana Army National Guard on 1 February 1989.

Coat of arms
Blazon
Shield
Per fess Argent and Azure, in chief a palm tree on mount Proper and in base a giant cactus and a fleur-de-lis Or.
 Crest
That for the regiments and separate battalions of the Montana Army National Guard:  On a wreath of the colors Argent and Azure a fleur-de-lis the middle leaf and tie Or, and outside leaves Argent. Motto:   MEN, DO YOUR DUTY.
 Symbolism
 Shield
The palm tree represents Philippine service, the giant cactus Mexican Border duty and the fleur-de-lis service in France during World War I.  Blue and white are the colors associated with Infantry and refer to the organization's combat service as the 163d Infantry during World War II.
 Crest
The crest is that of the Montana Army National Guard.
 Background
The coat of arms was originally approved for the 163d Infantry Regiment, Montana National Guard on 15 December 1941.  It was redesignated for the 163d Armored Cavalry Regiment, Montana National Guard on 17 September 1953.  The insignia was amended to change the symbolism on 21 January 1970.  It was amended to add the crest of the State of Oregon on 22 March 1971.  It was amended to delete the crest of the State of Oregon and add the crest of the State of Nevada on 20 January 1975.  The insignia was redesignated for the 163d Infantry Regiment and amended to delete the crest of the State of Nevada on 1 February 1989

Campaign streamers
Philippine Insurrection
 Manila
 Malolos
World War I
 Streamer without Inscription
World War II
 Papua
 New Guinea (with arrowhead)
 Luzon
 Southern Philippines (with arrowhead)

Decorations
 Presidential Unit Citation, streamer embroidered PAPUA
 Philippine Presidential Unit Citation streamer embroidered 17 OCTOBER 1944 TO 4 JULY 1945
 Valorous Unit Award 15 FEBRUARY 2005 TO 01 NOVEMBER 2005
 Meritorious Unit Commendation 15 NOVEMBER 2010 TO 30 AUGUST 2011

References

 Infantry Regiments of the U.S. Army by Sawicki

External links
 http://montanamilitarymuseum.org/

Military units and formations in Montana
Infantry regiments of the United States Army National Guard
Military units and formations established in 1884
163